The Bonaire Patriotic Union (UPB) is a Dutch local political party in the special municipality of Bonaire.

History
In the 2002 Netherlands Antilles general election, the party won 3.6% of the popular vote and 2 out of 22 seats. In the 2006 Netherlands Antilles general election, the party again won 2 out of 22 seats. It is a member of the Centrist Democrat International and the Christian Democrat Organization of America.

References

Political parties in Bonaire
Christian Democratic Appeal